Bruno Dumay (born 12 June 1960) is a French rower. He competed in the men's coxless four event at the 1992 Summer Olympics.

References

External links
 

1960 births
Living people
French male rowers
Olympic rowers of France
Rowers at the 1992 Summer Olympics
Sportspeople from Aisne